Khojawahid Zahedi (born 5 June 1960) is a former Afghanistan wrestler, who competed at the 1980 Summer Olympics in the welterweight event.

References

External links

Wrestlers at the 1980 Summer Olympics
Afghan male sport wrestlers
Olympic wrestlers of Afghanistan
1960 births
Living people
Place of birth missing (living people)
20th-century Afghan people